Referrer spam (also known as referral spam, log spam or referrer bombing) is a kind of spamdexing (spamming aimed at search engines). The technique involves making repeated web site requests using a fake referrer URL to the site the spammer wishes to advertise. Sites that publish their access logs, including referrer statistics, will then inadvertently link back to the spammer's site. These links will be indexed by search engines as they crawl the access logs, improving the spammer's search engine ranking. Except for polluting their statistics, the technique does not harm the affected sites.

At least since 2014, a new variation of this form of spam occurs on Google Analytics. Spammers send fake visits to Google Analytics, often without ever accessing the affected site. The technique is used to have the spammers' URLs appear in the site statistics, inducing the site owner to visit the spam URLs. When it is the case that the spammer has never visited the affected site, the fake visits are also called Ghost Spam.

Technical solutions
As with e-mail spam, referrer spam may be filtered or blocked. A website operator may mitigate referrer spam by preventing search engine spiders from crawling the site logs by moving them to a non-public area such as a password-protected area, by using a robot exclusion file, or by appending the nofollow value to the links.

Spammers that target third party analytics directly can pollute statistics, but do not consume the affected site's resources. Filtering referrer spam from analytics tools will hide it from reports. However, spammers that do visit the affected site will consume server bandwidth. To prevent this misuse, they can be blocked using various techniques, such as by blacklisting a list of IP addresses.

Non-technical solutions
Because the .htaccess solutions require technical expertise, several developers have created tools for non-technical people to block the spam more automatically, specifically for Google Analytics.

See also

Notes

External links
 Referrer Spam Blacklist by Matomo - a Community-contributed list of referrer spammers under Public Domain (550+ domains as of October 2017).

Black hat search engine optimization